The Santiago Library System (SLS) is a state-funded network of nine public library jurisdictions and two associate member libraries in Orange County, California. The system seeks "to promote cooperation and coordination of library collections and services so as to meet the informational, educational, cultural and recreational needs of all residents of the Orange County area."

History

First 40 years

On October 14, 1969, the Orange County Cooperative Library System was formed.  Twenty years later on December 29, 1989, the Orange County Cooperative Library System was converted into a California Library Services Act agency and renamed the Santiago Library System.

The SLS was a cooperative arrangement designed to maximize resources by providing programs and services jointly where it is mutually beneficial to the local population.

An important SLS role was facilitating the sharing of local collections by providing delivery of materials among the nine member libraries. The System enhanced the reference capabilities of these libraries by furnishing additional resources and expertise when needed to meet patrons' requests. SLS presented workshops, arranged staff training programs, and aided in the development of additional reference tools and services.

Dissolution

On July 1, 2009, SLS and the Metropolitan Cooperative Library System (MCLS) of Los Angeles County were combined and renamed the Southern California Library Cooperative (SCLC).  The web site lists staff directories, committee meeting dates, publications, useful links and upcoming workshops.  The Reference Center, with offices at the Central Library of the Los Angeles Public Library, provides member libraries with second-level reference support services.

Restoration

On June 30, 2013, the former SLS members withdrew from SCLC and reestablished SLS.  The Huntington Beach Public Library and the Orange County Public Law Library joined SLS as associate members.

The reconstituted SLS seeks "to promote cooperation and coordination of library collections and services so as to meet the informational, educational, cultural and recreational needs of all residents of the Orange County area."

Members
The nine original members of SLS also joined the reconstituted SLS:
Anaheim Public Library
Buena Park Library District
Fullerton Public Library
Mission Viejo Public Library
Newport Beach Public Library
Orange County Public Libraries (county library system)
Orange Public Library (city library)
Placentia Library District
Santa Ana Public Library
Yorba Linda Public Library

Upon its reestablishment in 2013, SLS gained two associate member libraries:
Huntington Beach Public Library
Orange County Public Law Library

References

External links
Santiago Library System
Southern California Library Cooperative

Member libraries
Anaheim Public Library
Buena Park Library District
Fullerton Public Library
Huntington Beach Public Library
Mission Viejo Public Library
Newport Beach Public Library
Orange County Public Libraries
Orange Public Library
Placentia Library District
Yorba Linda Library

Associate member libraries
Santa Ana Public Library
Orange County Public Law Library

Non-member public library in Orange County

Public libraries in California
Libraries in Orange County, California